Van de Graaf,  also spelled van de Graaff, van der Graaf or van der Graaff, is a Dutch surname. Notable people with this surname include the following:

 Van de Graaf
 Bobbie van de Graaf (born 1944), Dutch rower, unrelated to Freek and Jan
 Janet van de Graaf, Canadian improv artist and television actress
 Jeff Van de Graaf (born 1959), Australian swimmer
 Willem Jacob van de Graaf (1736–1804), Governor of Dutch Ceylon
Van de Graaff
 Adrian Van de Graaff (1891–1936), American college football player and coach
 Freek van de Graaff (1944–2009), Dutch rower, unrelated to Bobbie and Jan
 Hargrove Van de Graaff (1893–1938), American college football player 
 Jan van de Graaff (born 1944), Dutch rower, unrelated to Bobbie and Freek
 Peter Van de Graaff (born 1961), American singer and radio personality
 Robert J. Van de Graaff (1901–1967), American physicist
 William T. Van de Graaff (1895–1977), American football player
Van der Graaf
 Jan van der Graaf (1937–2022), Dutch church administrator
 Karen Van der Graaf (born 1962), Australian swimmer
 Pascal van der Graaf (born 1979), Dutch painter
 Valerie van der Graaf (born 1992), Dutch model
 Volkert van der Graaf (born 1969), Dutch environmentalist and assassin
Van der Graaff
 Laurien van der Graaff (born 1987), Swiss cross-country skier

See also
de Graaf (surname)
Van de Graaf canon, page construction originated in 1946 by Joh. A. van de Graaf in his Nieuwe berekening voor de vormgeving
Van de Graaff (crater)
Van de Graaff generator, an electrostatic generator that generates very high electrostatically stable voltages
Van der Graaf Generator, an English progressive rock band

Dutch-language surnames
Surnames of Dutch origin